Submycenaean pottery is a style of ancient Greek pottery. It is transitional between the preceding Mycenaean pottery and the subsequent styles of Greek vase painting, especially the Protogeometric style. The vases date to between 1030 and 1000 BC.

Submycenaean pottery is not very well researched, as only few sites from the period have been discovered so far. The style was first recognised in 1939 by Wilhelm Kraiker and Karl Kübler, based on finds from the Kerameikos and Pompeion cemeteries in Athens and on Salamis. The existence of the style remained disputed among archaeologists until later discoveries in Mycenae clearly showed the existence of separate Late Mycenaean and Submycenaean strata.

Submycenaean pottery occurs primarily in contexts such as inhumations and stone-built cist graves. Find locations are widely distributed, suggesting a settlement pattern of hamlets and villages. Apart from the sites mentioned above, Submycenaean pottery is known from locations such as Corinth, Asine, Kalapodi, Lefkandi and Tiryns.

The quality of the vases varies widely. Only few shapes were produced, especially stirrup jars with a pierced shoulder, belly amphorae and neck amphorae, lekythoi as well as jars, some with trefoil-shaped mouths. By the end of the Submycenaean period, the stirrup jar was replaced by the lekythos. Submycenaean decoration is rather simple, the hand-painted motifs are limited to horizontal or vertical wavy lines, single or double hatched and overlapping triangles, as well as single or multiple concentric semicircles. The shoulders of lekythoi, amphorae and stirrup jars bore ornamental decoration. Amphorae, amphoriskoi and jugs were usually painted with one or several thick wavy lines. In general, the style was much shorter and less carefully made than the previous types of pottery, leading one art historian to describe it as "rather unloveable".

Notes

References
 Thomas Mannack: Griechische Vasenmalerei. Eine Einführung. Theiss, Stuttgart 2002, p. 66f. .

Further reading
Betancourt, Philip P. 2007. Introduction to Aegean Art. Philadelphia: INSTAP Academic Press. 
Preziosi, Donald, and Louise A. Hitchcock. 1999. Aegean Art and Architecture. Oxford: Oxford University Press.

11th century BC in Greece
11th-century BC works
1939 archaeological discoveries
Ancient Greek pottery
Funerary art
Mycenaean art